Dance Floor (foaled 1989 in New Jersey) is a retired American Thoroughbred racehorse. He was bred by William Purdey at his Greenfields Farm in Colts Neck Township, New Jersey. Out of the mare, Dance Troupe, a granddaughter of U.S. racing Hall of fame inductee, Native Dancer, Dance Floor was sired by Star de Naskra, the 1979 American Champion Sprint Horse.

Hall of Fame trainer D. Wayne Lukas conditioned Dance Floor for owner MC Hammer, a rap singer who raced him under his Oaktown Stable banner. At age two, Dance Floor was one of the top colts in the United States, winner of the 1991 Breeders' Futurity Stakes and Kentucky Jockey Club Stakes and runnerup in the Hollywood Futurity. Sent off as the bettors' third choice in the Breeders' Cup Juvenile, he finished sixth under jockey Pat Day to winner Arazi in one of the most memorable wins in Breeders' Cup history.

Racing at age three, Dance Floor won Florida's Fountain of Youth Stakes, was second in the Florida Derby, and third in the Kentucky Derby and Travers Stakes.

Dance Floor was sold to breeders who retired him to stud duty in New Zealand.

References
 Dance Floor's pedigree and partial racing stats
 March 23, 1992 Sports Illustrated article titled This Colt Got Rapped

1989 racehorse births
Racehorses bred in New Jersey
Racehorses trained in the United States
Colts Neck Township, New Jersey
MC Hammer
Thoroughbred family 7